Kolodruma is a velodrome and a multifunctional indoor arena located in Plovdiv, Bulgaria. It has a seating capacity of 4,800 to 7,500 spectators depending on its use. It is built on the place of the former track cycling velodrome in Plovdiv and currently is the only indoor velodrome in Bulgaria.

Besides cycling events the arena can host additional 22 types of sports and can serve as concert's hall. The complex has also underground parking facility for 300 vehicles, a modern press centre, dressing rooms, coaching facilities, a sports-recreational centre, restaurants and a large commercial centre for a wide variety of sports merchandise and kit.

Construction
The architect of the project is the Dutch Sander Douma, who has previously created the largest-known velodromes in Europe, notably the facilities in Athens, Monte Carlo, Palma de Majorca, and Manchester amongst others.

The arena was officially opened on 30 August 2015 by the presence of numerous government officials and Bulgarian sports celebrities.

List of major concerts
 Chris Norman – 19 October 2015
 Lepa Brena — 8 April 2017
 16 years Planeta TV — 28 November 2017
 Bryan Adams – 14 November 2019
 18 years Planeta TV — 3 December 2019

List of major sporting events
ITF Taekwon-Do World Championship – August 2015
2016 Men's U20 Volleyball European Championship
2017 Bulgarian Basketball Cup
2018 FIVB Volleyball Men's World Championship
2020 UEC European Track Championships

See also
 List of indoor arenas in Bulgaria

References

External links

 

Indoor arenas in Bulgaria
Buildings and structures in Plovdiv
Sports venues in Plovdiv
Music venues in Bulgaria
Velodromes in Bulgaria
Music venues completed in 2015
Sports venues completed in 2015
Culture in Plovdiv
2015 establishments in Bulgaria